Tripartite means composed of or split into three parts, or refers to three parties. Specifically, it may also refer to any of the following:

 3 (number)
 Tripartite language
 Tripartite motto
 Tripartite System in British education
 Tripartite classification of authority
 Tripartite contract or agreement; between three parties

Political:
 Tripartite system (politics), the separation of political power among a legislature, an executive, and a judiciary
 Tripartite Agreement (Horn of Africa), a 2018 cooperation agreement between Eritrea, Ethiopia and Somalia
 Tripartite Agreement of 1936, an international monetary agreement entered into by the United States, France, and Great Britain to stabilize their nations' currencies.
 Tripartite Pact between the Axis Powers of World War II
 Britain–India–Nepal Tripartite Agreement, signed in 1947 concerning the rights of Gurkhas in military service.
 Tripartite Declaration of 1950, signed by the United States, Britain, and France to guarantee the territorial status quo determined by Arab–Israeli armistice agreements
 Three-parties, the "Three-parties alliance", or Tripartisme, a coalition government in France after World War 2
 Madrid Accords, signed by Spain, Morocco, and Mauritania in 1975 to end Spanish presence in the territory of Spanish Sahara
 The Tripartite Accord (Lebanon), signed on 28 December 1985 between three factions to end the Lebanese Civil War
 The Tripartite Accord (Angola), signed between Cuba, Angola and South Africa on 22 December 1988 to end the Angolan Civil War
 Tripartite Alliance, a 1990s political alliance in South Africa
 Tripartism, or Tripartite consultations, between representatives of the government, workers, and employers
 Tripartite Struggle, between the Pratihara, Rashtrakuta and Pala Empires, centered at the Kannauj Triangle
Trialism in Austria-Hungary, a political movement that aimed to create a Croatian state equal in status to Austria and Hungary.
 Tripartite Convention, an 1899 convention between the US, UK, and Germany that partitioned the Samoan islands

Religious:
 Tripartite view, in Christian theology, holds that man is a composite of three distinct components: body, soul and spirit.
 Tripartite Tractate, a third or mid-fourth century Gnostic work found in the Nag Hammadi library
 Historiae Ecclesiasticae Tripartitae Epitome, a medieval church history book, also known as Tripartite History

Other:
 Tripartite Bridge
 Tripartite-class minehunter, a ship

May refer to:
 The tripartite periodization of history into ancient, Middle Ages and modern. See Middle Age for more information.
 The European Tripartite Programme, a trilingual engineering formation.

See also 
 Trichotomy (disambiguation)